was the first Chief Justice of Japan (1947–1950).

References

Bibliography
山本祐司『最高裁物語（上・下）』（日本評論社、1994年）（講談社+α文庫、1997年）
佐野比呂己「教材「ろくをさばく」をめぐって」、『国語論集』第7巻、北海道教育大学 (:en:Hokkaido University of Education）釧路校国語科教育研究室、2010年3月、 NAID 110009444025。
佐野比呂己「教材「ろくをさばく」考(2)」、『北海道教育大学紀要. 教育科学編』第60巻第1号、北海道教育大学、2009年8月、 NAID 110007224817。
佐野比呂己「教材「ろくをさばく」考(3)」、『釧路論集 : 北海道教育大学釧路分校研究報告』第41号、北海道教育大学、2009年12月、 、 NAID 110008767341。
佐野比呂己「教材「ろくをさばく」考(4)」、『釧路論集 : 北海道教育大学釧路分校研究報告』第41巻、北海道教育大学、2010年2月、 、 NAID 110008428846。
佐野比呂己「教材「ろくをさばく」考(5)」、『北海道教育大学紀要. 教育科学編』第61巻第1号、北海道教育大学、2010年10月、 NAID 110008428896。

External links
 会津人物伝・三淵忠彦

1880 births
1950 deaths
Chief justices of Japan
Kyoto University alumni
People from Okayama Prefecture